Yangon Tram begun service on a single tram line on 11 January 2016. Yangon previously had a tramway network which closed down during World War II. Funded by Japanese investment, the tram line service at Strand Road terminates between Wardan Jetty and Linsadaung, Botataung Township, a journey of around  using a single 50-year old tram from Hiroshima Electric Railway in Hiroshima, Japan.

The rolling stock is a 3-coach tram with a seating capacity of 200 passengers. The tram runs just 6 times each day, from 8:00 am to 4:00 pm with a fare of Ks.100/-, around US$0.08.

Yangon Tram stopped service on 1 July 2016 after only six months of running.

Rangoon tram
In British Burma, Rangoon's first tramway was built in 1884. The three standard gauge routes of the Rangoon Steam Tramway Company opened on 4th March 1884. It was a stream tramway and ran from the Strand to Shwedagon. Electric trams were introduced by 15 December 1906 and the last of the routes opened on 12 March 1908. The total tramway system consisted of five routes and a total distance of 22 km with 77 cars in operation with tram depots and a generating station at Ahlone. By the 1930s trams provided efficient public transportation all around the city of Rangoon. The tramway system were destroyed during World War II by the retreating British and Japanese air raids especially during the Japanese invasion of Burma in 1942. The generation station was reconstructed to supply electricity but was eventually nationalised in 1953 and the tramway company was dissolved in 1961.

See also
 Yangon BRT

References

Tram transport in Myanmar
Metre gauge railways in Myanmar
Transport in Yangon
Defunct town tramway systems by city